Daniele Amerini (born 3 August 1974 in Florence) is a former Italian footballer who played as a midfielder.

Career
In October 1998, Amerini originally exchanged to Reggiana as part of Stefano Guidoni and Antonio Marasco deal, but the deal later collapsed after the contract failed to submit to Lega Calcio, as lack of Amerini's signature.

After Maurizio Zamparini purchased Palermo in July 2002, Zamparini signed most of the squad of Venezia he previous own, and sent Amerini and Andrea Guerra to Venezia.

In November 2008, Amerini returned to Serie B club Modena on free transfer.

References

External links

1974 births
Italian footballers
Italy under-21 international footballers
Reggina 1914 players
ACF Fiorentina players
Palermo F.C. players
L.R. Vicenza players
Hellas Verona F.C. players
Venezia F.C. players
Delfino Pescara 1936 players
S.S. Arezzo players
Modena F.C. players
Association football midfielders
Living people
Footballers from Florence
Frosinone Calcio players
S.S.D. Lucchese 1905 players
U.S. Pistoiese 1921 players
Serie A players
Serie B players